In commutative algebra, the multiplier ideal associated to a sheaf of ideals over a complex variety and a real number c consists (locally) of the functions h such that

 

is locally integrable, where the fi are a finite set of local generators of the ideal.

Algebraic geometry 
In algebraic geometry, the multiplier ideal of an effective -divisor measures singularities coming from the fractional parts of D.  Multiplier ideals are often applied in tandem with vanishing theorems such as the Kodaira vanishing theorem and the Kawamata–Viehweg vanishing theorem.

Let X be a smooth complex variety and D an effective -divisor on it. Let  be a log resolution of D (e.g., Hironaka's resolution). The multiplier ideal of D is

where  is the relative canonical divisor: . If D is integral, then .

See also 
Canonical singularity
Test ideal

References

Commutative algebra
Algebraic geometry